The Centre for Applied Philosophy and Public Ethics (CAPPE) was a research center at Charles Sturt University and the University of Melbourne. CAPPE ceased operation on 31 December 2016. Its website has been archived and the academic staff and research projects have transferred to the Faculty of Arts and Education at Charles Sturt University.

Activity
The Centre was under the directorship of Suzanne Uniacke. Professorial Fellows included Tom Campbell, CAJ (Tony) Coady, Clive Hamilton, John Kleinig, Seumas Miller, Peter Singer, and Steven Vanderheiden. Adjunct Professors include Marilyn Friedman, Larry May, Ingmar Persson, Igor Primoratz, Doris Schroeder, Janna Thompson, and Christopher Wellman.

The Centre's work was organised around five integrated research areas:
Security (including policing and crime, terrorism and counterterrorism, and international conflict)
Economy 
Health 
Technology 
Ecology

Publications 
The centre published a journal, Res Publica, which ran from the early 1990s until 2009.

References

External links 
Centre for Applied Philosophy and Public Ethics home page

Philosophy institutes
Charles Sturt University
University of Melbourne
Ethics organizations
Philosophical societies in Australia
Organizations disestablished in 2016
Organizations established in 2000